Jordan Hill (born Whitney Jordan Hill) is an American singer-songwriter.

Hill was originally signed by producer David Foster to his own label 143 Records, a division of Warner Music Group. Her first song, "Remember Me This Way", which was produced by Foster, became the film Casper's theme song and was released as a single.

Jordan Hill's self-titled debut album was released on May 21, 1996, and was produced by David Foster, Greg Charley, Rhett Lawrence, Jeff Pescetto, SoulShock & Karlin and Mario Winans. Hill covered many songs, such as Cheryl Lynn's "Got to Be Real", Oleta Adams' "I Just Had to Hear Your Voice", and Lisa Stansfield's "Make It Right". "For the Love of You", produced by Foster and Winans, was released as the first single; it became a hit both on the Billboard Hot 100 and R&B/Hip-Hop charts. However, the remix version by Tony Moran became her biggest hit, going Top 10 on the Hot Dance Music/Club Play chart.

The second single, released only in Europe, was "How Many Times" (which was later covered by Aretha Franklin) and the third single, also a Europe exclusive, was "Too Much Heaven", a cover of the Bee Gees song and featured Barry Gibb singing backup. Due to a lack of support and promotion, she left the label.

Hill has worked with some notable artists, such as the Bee Gees and Jim Brickman, whose 1999 Top 10 adult contemporary hit "Destiny" featured Hill on vocals, along with Billy Porter.

As of 2014, Hill was writing and recording her second album, which was initially scheduled for release in 2015.

Discography

Albums

Singles

Other appearances

References

External links
Official website

1978 births
Living people
American women pop singers
Musicians from Knoxville, Tennessee
Singers from Tennessee
20th-century American women singers
21st-century American women singers
20th-century American singers
21st-century American singers